Calgary Centre (formerly known as Calgary South Centre) is a federal electoral district in Alberta, Canada, that has been represented in the House of Commons of Canada since 1968.  The riding consists of many young adults who have a relatively high average household income and education level. As the riding encompasses the downtown core and large swaths of apartment blocks in the communities west and south of downtown, Calgary Centre has a low home ownership rate compared to the rest of Canada.

History

The original Calgary Centre was created in 1966 from parts of the former electoral districts of Calgary North and Calgary South. This riding was abolished in the 2003 Representation Order when parts of it went to the neighbouring electoral districts of Calgary North Centre and Calgary West and to Calgary South Centre. The latter was renamed Calgary Centre in 2004. When it was created in 2003 (as Calgary South Centre), it included 70,972 people from the abolished district of Calgary Centre, 38,889 people from Calgary West and 7,578 from Calgary Southwest.

The riding was notable at the 2000 federal election when residents elected former Prime Minister Joe Clark, representing the Progressive Conservatives, making the riding one of the few areas in Alberta that did not elect a candidate from the Canadian Alliance.

This riding lost territory to Calgary Signal Hill and gained territory from Calgary East during the 2012 electoral redistribution.

Geography
The riding contains the neighbourhoods of Downtown Calgary, Beltline, Mission, Cliff Bungalow, Mount Royal, Elbow Park, Scarboro, Sunalta, Shaganappi, Killarney/Glengarry, Richmond, Bankview, South Calgary, Rutland Park, CFB - Currie, Lincoln Park, CFB - Lincoln Park, Altadore, North Glenmore Park, Britannia, Elboya, Windsor Park, Manchester, Bel-Aire, Mayfair, Meadowlark Park, Inglewood, Ramsay, Parkhill, Erlton, Rideau/Roxboro, Eau Claire, Chinatown, Downtown East Village

Demographics

Ethnic groups (2006): 78.80% White, 5.89% Chinese, 2.76% Black, 2.44% Aboriginal, 2.29% South Asian, 2.05% Filipino, 1.21% Latin American, 1.09% Arab 
Languages (2011): 73.19% English, 4.13% Chinese, 2.09% French, 2.04% Spanish, 1.76% Tagalog, 1.21% Arabic, 1.21% Korean 
Religions (2001): 32.63% Protestant, 24.52% Catholic, 2.23% Christian Orthodox, 4.88% Other Christian, 2.60% Muslim, 1.09% Jewish, 1.04% Buddhist, 30.14% No religion
Median income (2005): $30,729

Members of Parliament

This riding has elected the following members of the House of Commons of Canada:

Current Member of Parliament
This seat is held by Greg McLean.  McLean, a member of the Conservative Party of Canada, was elected in the 2019 federal election.

Election results

Calgary Centre, 2006–present

|-

Calgary South Centre, 2004–2005

Results based on redistributed results. Conservative Party change is compared to a combination of Progressive Conservative Party and Canadian Alliance totals.

Calgary Centre, 1966–2003

|align="left" colspan=2|Progressive Conservative gain from Reform
|align="right"|Swing
|align="right"| -14.5
|align="right"|

See also
 List of Canadian federal electoral districts
 Past Canadian electoral districts

Notes

References
 
 
 
 
 2011 results from Elections Canada
 Canadian Census, 2001 profile of Calgary Centre
 Canadian Census, 2001 profile of Calgary South Centre
 Expenditures - 2008
 Expenditures - 2004
 Expenditures - 2000
 Expenditures - 1997
 SI/2003-154: Electoral Boundaries Readjustment Act: Proclamation Declaring the Representation Order to be in Force Effective on the First Dissolution of Parliament that Occurs after August 25, 2004, Canada Gazette Part II, Vol. 137, No. 6 Extra, 29 August 2003
 2003 Representation Order Transposition of Population

External links
 Calgary Centre Riding All Candidate Debate (Video and Transcript) for Canadian 2008 Election

Alberta federal electoral districts
Politics of Calgary